The Drogheda Independent is a newspaper that serves the Drogheda area, including Drogheda, Mid-Louth and East Meath.

The newspaper covers many thing's from local and regional news and advertisements including its own database of records. It is Drogheda's only non-free newspaper, the other main newspaper in Drogheda being the non-fee paying Drogheda Leader.

The paper is owned by Mediahuis, through its subsidiary Independent News & Media.

References

External links
 

1884 establishments in Ireland
Independent
Independent News & Media
Mass media in County Meath
Mass media in County Louth
Newspapers published in the Republic of Ireland
Newspapers established in 1884